Kyung-soo, also spelled Kyoung-soo, is a Korean masculine given name. Its meaning differs based on the hanja used to write each syllable of the name. There are 54 hanja with the reading "kyung" and 67 hanja with the reading "soo" on the South Korean government's official list of hanja which may be registered for use in given names. According to South Korean government data, Kyung-soo was the seventh-most popular name for baby boys born in 1940.

People with this name include:
Choi Gyeong-su (born 1945), South Korean wrestler
Byun Kyung-soo (born 1958), South Korean sport shooter
Kim Kyoung-soo (born 1967), South Korean politician
Park Kyung-soo (born 1969), South Korean television screenwriter
Lee Kyung-soo (born 1973), South Korean football defender
Lee Gyeong-su (born 1979), South Korean volleyball player
Ko Kyung-soo (born 1985), South Korean handball player 
D.O. (entertainer) (born Doh Kyung-soo, 1993), South Korean singer and actor, member of boy band EXO

Fictional characters with this name include:
Kim Kyung-soo, in 2001 South Korean film Volcano High

See also
List of Korean given names

References

Korean masculine given names